Terry Kung is an international lawn bowler from Hong Kong.

Bowls career
Kung was selected as part of the five man team by Hong Kong for the 2016 World Outdoor Bowls Championship, which was held in Avonhead, Christchurch, New Zealand.

He won a fours bronze medal (with Chun Yat Wong, Tony Cheung and Jason Choi), at the 2015 Asia Pacific Bowls Championships, held in Christchurch, New Zealand.

References

Hong Kong male bowls players
Living people
Year of birth missing (living people)